The AQM-128 was a short-lived program undertaken by the United States Navy for the development of a subscale target drone, launched from aircraft and capable of supersonic speed. The AQM-128 was intended to use pre-programmed guidance.

The program for development of the new target drone was begun in 1983; in January 1984, the designation YAQM-128A was approved for the program. However, the program was cancelled in April that year before any designs were selected.

References

Citations

Bibliography

 

Aircraft manufactured in the United States
Cancelled military aircraft projects of the United States
Unmanned military aircraft of the United States
Single-engined jet aircraft